Lluch is a surname. Notable people with the surname include:

Antoni Rubió i Lluch (1856–1937), Spanish historian
Ernest Lluch (1937–2000), Spanish economist and politician
Rosa Lluch Bramon, Spanish historian
Vicente Rojo Lluch (1894–1966), Spanish military officer

Catalan-language surnames